Bobby Bruch is a retired American soccer player who played professionally in the Western Soccer Alliance, Major Indoor Soccer League and American Professional Soccer League.  He has coached at the youth, college and professional levels.

Youth
Bruch graduated from Newport High School where he was a member of the 1982 Washington State High School soccer championship team. In 1985 and 1986, the Falcons won the NCAA Men's Division II Soccer Championship. Bruch graduated with a bachelor's degree in business management.

Professional
In 1986, Bruch signed with the F.C. Seattle Storm of the Western Soccer Alliance.  He played three seasons with Seattle, winning the 1988 WSA championship.  In the fall of 1988, he joined the Los Angeles Lazers for the 1988-1989 Major Indoor Soccer League season.  In 1989, he played for the California Kickers of the WSA.  In 1990, he moved to the Los Angeles Heat of the American Professional Soccer League.  In 1994, Bruch joined the Anaheim Splash of the Continental Indoor Soccer League.  His first game with the Splash came in the Western Conference final series where he scored the winning goal.

Coach
In 1992, Bruch became the head coach of the Marina High School girls' soccer team, a position he held for four years.  He left the team at the end of the 1995 season to coach the Mission Viejo Shamrocks, a girls' youth club.  On October 17, 2000, Seattle Pacific University hired Bruch as the school's first women's soccer coach.  He was the 2002 Great Northwest Athletic Conference Coach of the Year.  In 2002, he resigned at the end of the season having compiled a two-season record of 21-14-3.  In January 2002, he was also hired to coach the Seattle Sounders Women of the W-League.

References

External links
 MISL: Bobby Bruch

Living people
1966 births
American soccer coaches
American soccer players
American Professional Soccer League players
Anaheim Splash players
California Kickers players
Continental Indoor Soccer League players
Los Angeles Heat players
Los Angeles Lazers players
Major Indoor Soccer League (1978–1992) players
Seattle Pacific Falcons men's soccer players
Seattle Storm (soccer) players
USL W-League (1995–2015) coaches
Western Soccer Alliance players
Soccer players from Washington (state)
Association football forwards
Association football midfielders